The canton of Tourcoing-2 is an administrative division of the Nord department, northern France. It was created at the French canton reorganisation which came into effect in March 2015. Its seat is in Tourcoing.

It consists of the following communes:
Tourcoing (partly)

References

Cantons of Nord (French department)